The Craik Baronetcy, of Kennoway in the County of Fife, was a title in the Baronetage of the United Kingdom. It was created on 27 January 1926 for the politician Sir Henry Craik, KCB, PC. The title became extinct in 1955 on the death of his younger son, the 3rd Baronet.

Incumbents
Sir Henry Craik, 1st Baronet (1846–1927)
Sir George Lillie Craik, MC, 2nd Baronet (1874–1929)
Sir Henry Duffield Craik, KCSI 3rd Baronet (1876–1955), Governor of the Punjab 1938–41

Arms

References

Sources 

Extinct baronetcies in the Baronetage of the United Kingdom